You Taught My Heart to Sing is an album by saxophonist Houston Person and pianist Bill Charlap recorded in 2004 and released on the HighNote label in 2006.

Reception

The AllMusic review by Al Campbell said "the mood is relaxed yet not moribund, nor does the duo succumb to adding weepy strings or sappy horn arrangements. Person and Charlap don't break any new ground with this recording; rather they continue to showcase their combined enduring passion for ballads". In JazzTimes, Owen Cordle stated "In another era, this album might have been labeled “mood music.” It consists of tenor saxophonist Person and pianist Charlap in a set of mostly romantic standards. Person is restrained throughout, even when the tempo moves beyond a ballad pace, and Charlap is the ideal, ever-sensitive accompanist. If you appreciate melody, you’ll dig this album".

Track listing 
 "You Taught My Heart to Sing" (McCoy Tyner, Sammy Cahn) – 5:23
 "Namely You" (Gene de Paul, Johnny Mercer) – 5:29
 "Where Are You?" (Jimmy McHugh, Harold Adamson) – 5:09	
 "Sweet Lorraine" (Cliff Burwell, Mitchell Parish) – 5:11
 "If I Ruled the World" (Leslie Bricusse, Cyril Ornadel) – 5:40	
 "'S Wonderful" (George Gershwin, Ira Gershwin) – 5:29	
 "Where Is Love" (Lionel Bart) – 6:40
 "I Was Telling Her About You" (Moose Charlap, Don George) – 4:27
 "Don't Forget the Blues" (Ray Brown) – 6:28
 "I Wonder Where Our Love Has Gone" (Buddy Johnson) – 7:01

Personnel 
Houston Person - tenor saxophone 
Bill Charlap - piano

References 

Houston Person albums
Bill Charlap albums
2006 albums
HighNote Records albums
Albums recorded at Van Gelder Studio